Drew Banfield (born 27 February 1974) is a former Australian rules footballer who played for the West Coast Eagles in the Australian Football League (AFL).

Selected as the number 1 pick in the 1992 AFL Draft, Banfield was recruited to West Coast, where he became one of their best clubmen and hardest-working defenders and utility players.

He won the Eagles' Club Champion Award in 1996, as well as playing in the Eagles' 1994 premiership side. 

In 2006, Banfield was struggling for selection and fought his way into the side in round 9, but remained on the fringes of selection throughout the season. He missed out on the semi-final against the  but was recalled for the preliminary final against , and retained for the Grand Final against  due to his experience. It was his second AFL premiership, twelve years after his first, and made him the only player to appear in both West Coast's 1994 and 2006 premiership teams. On Friday 6 October 2006, Banfield announced his retirement from AFL football at the West Coast Eagles Club Champion awards, having played 265 games.

Banfield is married to Amber Lee-Steere and has four children, three sons, Bailey, Charlie and Harper, and Willow.

Statistics

|- style="background-color: #EAEAEA"
! scope="row" style="text-align:center" | 1993
|style="text-align:center;"|
| 31 || 7 || 2 || 2 || 57 || 19 || 76 || 14 || 9 || 0.3 || 0.3 || 8.1 || 2.7 || 10.9 || 2.0 || 1.3
|-
|style="text-align:center;background:#afe6ba;"|1994†
|style="text-align:center;"|
| 6 || 24 || 7 || 4 || 192 || 116 || 308 || 39 || 46 || 0.3 || 0.2 || 8.0 || 4.8 || 12.8 || 1.6 || 1.9
|- style="background:#eaeaea;"
! scope="row" style="text-align:center" | 1995
|style="text-align:center;"|
| 6 || 23 || 6 || 7 || 180 || 179 || 359 || 53 || 48 || 0.3 || 0.3 || 7.8 || 7.8 || 15.6 || 2.3 || 2.1
|-
! scope="row" style="text-align:center" | 1996
|style="text-align:center;"|
| 6 || 24 || 9 || 3 || 240 || 220 || 460 || 72 || 48 || 0.4 || 0.1 || 10.0 || 9.2 || 19.2 || 3.0 || 2.0
|- style="background:#eaeaea;"
! scope="row" style="text-align:center" | 1997
|style="text-align:center;"|
| 6 || 21 || 14 || 8 || 229 || 176 || 405 || 70 || 53 || 0.7 || 0.4 || 10.9 || 8.4 || 19.3 || 3.3 || 2.5
|-
! scope="row" style="text-align:center" | 1998
|style="text-align:center;"|
| 6 || 22 || 11 || 4 || 217 || 148 || 365 || 60 || 51 || 0.5 || 0.2 || 9.9 || 6.7 || 16.6 || 2.7 || 2.3
|- style="background:#eaeaea;"
! scope="row" style="text-align:center" | 1999
|style="text-align:center;"|
| 6 || 24 || 6 || 8 || 259 || 173 || 432 || 59 || 18 || 0.3 || 0.3 || 10.8 || 7.2 || 18.0 || 2.5 || 0.8
|- 
! scope="row" style="text-align:center" | 2000
|style="text-align:center;"|
| 6 || 17 || 6 || 3 || 162 || 138 || 300 || 44 || 40 || 0.4 || 0.2 || 9.5 || 8.1 || 17.6 || 2.6 || 2.4
|- style="background:#eaeaea;"
! scope="row" style="text-align:center" | 2001
|style="text-align:center;"|
| 6 || 9 || 4 || 1 || 76 || 69 || 145 || 24 || 23 || 0.4 || 0.1 || 8.4 || 7.7 || 16.1 || 2.7 || 2.6
|- 
! scope="row" style="text-align:center" | 2002
|style="text-align:center;"|
| 6 || 22 || 1 || 2 || 168 || 123 || 291 || 55 || 56 || 0.0 || 0.1 || 7.6 || 5.6 || 13.2 || 2.5 || 2.5
|- style="background:#eaeaea;"
! scope="row" style="text-align:center" | 2003
|style="text-align:center;"|
| 6 || 22 || 3 || 4 || 145 || 142 || 287 || 54 || 38 || 0.1 || 0.2 || 6.6 || 6.5 || 13.0 || 2.5 || 1.7
|- 
! scope="row" style="text-align:center" | 2004
|style="text-align:center;"|
| 6 || 11 || 2 || 0 || 110 || 56 || 166 || 42 || 21 || 0.2 || 0.0 || 10.0 || 5.1 || 15.1 || 3.8 || 1.9
|- style="background:#eaeaea;"
! scope="row" style="text-align:center" | 2005
|style="text-align:center;"|
| 6 || 25 || 3 || 2 || 197 || 145 || 342 || 90 || 46 || 0.1 || 0.1 || 7.9 || 5.8 || 13.7 || 3.6 || 1.8
|- 
|style="text-align:center;background:#afe6ba;"|2006†
|style="text-align:center;"|
| 6 || 14 || 2 || 0 || 106 || 88 || 194 || 53 || 27 || 0.1 || 0.0 || 7.6 || 6.3 || 13.9 || 3.8 || 1.9
|- class="sortbottom"
! colspan=3| Career
! 265
! 76
! 48
! 2338
! 1792
! 4130
! 729
! 524
! 0.3
! 0.2
! 8.8
! 6.8
! 15.6
! 2.8
! 2.0
|}

References

External links

West Coast Eagles players
West Coast Eagles Premiership players
1974 births
Living people
Subiaco Football Club players
People educated at Scotch College, Perth
Australian rules footballers from Western Australia
Western Australian State of Origin players
John Worsfold Medal winners
Two-time VFL/AFL Premiership players